Abzanovo (Abźan) is a rural locality (a selo) and the administrative center of Abzanovsky Selsoviet of Arkhangelsky District, Bashkortostan, Russia. The population was 836 as of 2010. There are 11 streets.

Geography 
The village is located on the left bank of the Inzer River, 15 km northwest of Arkhangelskoye (the district's administrative centre) by road. Asy is the nearest rural locality.

Ethnicity 
The village is inhabited by Bashkirs and others.

References 

Rural localities in Arkhangelsky District